The Newport Casino Invitational was a men's tennis tournament played on outdoor grass courts between 1915 and 1967 at the Newport Casino in Newport, Rhode Island. The event was first held in 1915 when the U.S. National Championships, which had been held at the Newport Casino since 1881, moved to Forest Hills, New York. The Casino Invitational became a preparation tournament for the U.S. National Championships. Since its inception, with a field of fifty players, it consistently attracted the best of the US contingent of tennis players and many high-profile international contenders as well. With the advent of the open era in 1968 the Newport Casino Invitational ended though there were pro tournaments held at the same venue with the modified Van Alen Streamlined Scoring System (VASSS).

Men's champions

See also
 Hall of Fame Tennis Championships – professional tournament held since 1968.

Notes

References

Grass court tennis tournaments
Defunct tennis tournaments in the United States
Tennis tournaments in Rhode Island
Newport, Rhode Island
Recurring sporting events established in 1915
Recurring sporting events disestablished in 1967
1967 disestablishments in Rhode Island
1915 establishments in Rhode Island